Henry Theodore Olmsted (January 12, 1879 – January 6, 1969) was a starting pitcher in Major League Baseball who played briefly for the Boston Americans during the 1905 season. A native of Sac Bay, Michigan, he attended University of Notre Dame and Valparaiso University. He later played for the Denver Grizzlies in the Western League.

Olmsted posted a 1–2 record with a 3.24 ERA in three appearances, including three complete games, six strikeouts, 12 walks, 18 hits allowed, and 25.0 innings of work.

Olmsted died in Bradenton, Florida at age 89.

See also
1905 Boston Americans season

References

External links
Baseball Reference
Retrosheet

Boston Americans players
Major League Baseball pitchers
University of Notre Dame alumni
Valparaiso Beacons baseball players
Notre Dame Fighting Irish baseball players
Baseball players from Michigan
1879 births
1969 deaths
Milwaukee Brewers (minor league) players
Peoria Distillers players
Columbus Senators players
Jersey City Skeeters players
Kansas City Blues (baseball) players
Denver Grizzlies (baseball) players
Oakland Oaks (baseball) players
People from Delta County, Michigan